Wim Meutstege (born 28 July 1952 in Lochem, Gelderland) is a Dutch former footballer who played as a defender.

Career
During his club career he played for Go Ahead Eagles, Excelsior Rotterdam, Sparta Rotterdam and AFC Ajax. He earned 1 cap for the Netherlands national football team, and was included in their squad for the 1976 UEFA European Football Championship.

References

External links
  Profile

1952 births
Living people
Dutch footballers
Netherlands international footballers
UEFA Euro 1976 players
Eredivisie players
Go Ahead Eagles players
Excelsior Rotterdam players
Sparta Rotterdam players
AFC Ajax players
Footballers from Deventer
Association football defenders